Mylène Fleury (born 12 January 1975) is a Canadian gymnast. She competed in six events at the 1992 Summer Olympics.

References

1975 births
Living people
Canadian female artistic gymnasts
Olympic gymnasts of Canada
Gymnasts at the 1992 Summer Olympics
Gymnasts from Montreal
Pan American Games medalists in gymnastics
Pan American Games silver medalists for Canada
Gymnasts at the 1991 Pan American Games
Medalists at the 1991 Pan American Games
20th-century Canadian women
21st-century Canadian women